Box Hall Plantation in Thomasville, Georgia is notable for its main house built in Georgian Revival style designed by New York architects Delano & Aldrich and built during 1930–31.  It replaced the first "big house", named Box Hall, which was built on the property in 1857 by A. T. MacIntyre and his wife, the former America Young.  That house was lost in a fire around 1929.

The listing includes seven contributing buildings, two contributing structures, and a contributing site.

References

Houses on the National Register of Historic Places in Georgia (U.S. state)
Colonial Revival architecture in Georgia (U.S. state)
Georgian Revival architecture in Georgia (U.S. state)
Houses completed in 1931
Houses in Thomas County, Georgia
National Register of Historic Places in Thomas County, Georgia
Plantations in Georgia (U.S. state)